Dramane Kone (surname also spelled Koné; born 1982) is a master drummer and griot from Burkina Faso who rose to prominence in 1997 via his appearance (studying balafon at age 4) in the award-winning Taali Laafi Rosselini epic (20 years in the making) documentary film Great Great Grandparents Music that featured vignettes of Dramane Kone's griot family life in west Africa. He specializes in the goblet-shaped hand drum called djembe. He is a member of the Dioula ethnic group.

Regional Origins
Dramane Kone was born in the capital city of Ouagadougou, in central Burkina Faso. He began studying music at the age of three (his family says practically from birth), under Dougoutigui Kone, elder djembefola (master djembe player) of Ouagadougou. Kone was educated in the ancient drumming traditions of west Africa, and was initiated into the history and music of the Manding (also spelled Mandingue) people. His later musical education included private studies with a number of lesser-known village elders, masters and griots. In discussions with writers, Kone teaches that griots are the spokespeople of the kings and are the originators of what we now call music. He said in an interview in November, 2010, "The king would come tell the griots his messages intended for the king's subjects in the form of a story. 'When you finish playing your music, assemble the people to receive my message in the form of the story I am about to tell you,' the king might say," as Kone relates a griot family's mission. Kone asserts that griots are useful to communicate both the king's official messages in his language, and additional musical messages via local languages as conveyed by skilled drummers as is well known in west African and other Earthly traditions.

Family Background, Early Travels
Dramane Kone is the son of well-known musical griot/master drummer Dougoutigui Kone. After their appearances in the Rosselini film, his father had moved the family to and from Mali, west Africa, and Dramane had begun to win national contests starting in 1996, the film was released in 1997, and in 1998 Dramane went on to perform as djembefola (djembe drummer) with the National Ballet of Burkina Faso (he also plays Dunun, Balafon and Ngoni) accompanying dancers in the ballet and was then promoted to lead djembefola in the NBBF before migrating to the U.S. in 1999 (where he is a citizen and resides in California, and whence he teaches drumming and travels to performances around the world).

Other Travels and Notable Appearances
Kone's most recent appearance is as a percussionist in the song "Free" recorded by Stevie Wonder in August, 2013. He also appeared as a background musician along with Wonder in a Heineken beer TV ad recorded in November, 2012.

Dramane Kone traveled widely in western Europe in 1997-1998. In the U.S. he has performed at hundreds of venues including convention centres, large theatres, small clubs, private colleges and public universities 1999-2010. In November, 2009 he taught a special public master class on djembe and dunun at the Toronto Centre for the Arts sponsored by the Burkina Faso consulate and a private association of Burkina Faso expatriates to benefit flood victims in his country of origin. He organized and performed with Djelia Kadi in a similar benefit event at Motherland Music, a retail African import music store in Los Angeles in January, 2010.

He is also the brother of notable griot and master drummer Mamadou Koné (d. 2012), and the two Koné brothers and their father played together in various traditional and popular music ensembles in Burkina Faso and elsewhere. Their griot lineage extends many generations.

Koné resides in Santa Monica, California, United States.

Discography
Djelia Kadi (2003 CD) Traditional west African Drumming featuring Dramane's dance music group (title tr. "It's good to be a griot.").

Film/Video
• Great Great Grandparents Music (1997 Documentary Film) produced and directed by Taali Laafi Rosselini United States
Role: Subject (music student).

• Ballet Djelia Kadi with Dramane Koné, Master Drummer (2010 CD/DVD), produced by David Hilal and Miro (24 tracks: 12 audio, 12 video).

See also
Djembe

External links
Dramane Kone official site
David Hilal's YouTube.com channel
Dramane Kone's Facebook page

1982 births
Living people
African drummers
Burkinabé musicians
Master drummers
21st-century drummers
21st-century Burkinabé people